This is a list of Foreign Ministers of Denmark since the establishment of the Ministry of Foreign Affairs in 1848.

List of Danish Foreign Ministers (1848–present)

Minister of Foreign Affairs under Frederick VII (1848–1863)

Minister of Foreign Affairs under Christian IX (1863–1906)

Minister of Foreign Affairs under Frederik VIII (1906–1912)

Minister of Foreign Affairs under Christian X (1912–1947)

Office is assumed by the permanent secretary.

Minister of Foreign Affairs under Frederik IX (1947–1972)

Minister of Foreign Affairs under Margrethe II (1972–present)

Notes

Denmark
Foreign Ministers